He Zhen is the name of:

 He Zhen (count) (1321–1388), Ming dynasty politician
 He Zhen (artist) (1541–1606), Ming dynasty seal artist
 He Zhen (anarchist) (1884–1920), Chinese feminist and anarchist